Dominic Naylor (born 12 August 1970) is an English former footballer who played as a left-sided defender and midfielder.

External links

1970 births
Living people
Footballers from Hertfordshire
Sportspeople from Watford
English footballers
Association football fullbacks
Watford F.C. players
Halifax Town A.F.C. players
Barnet F.C. players
Plymouth Argyle F.C. players
Gillingham F.C. players
Leyton Orient F.C. players
Stevenage F.C. players
Dagenham & Redbridge F.C. players
Basingstoke Town F.C. players
St Albans City F.C. players